Rachel Thompson is an athlete.

Rachel Thompson may also refer to:

Rachel Ford Thompson (1856–1906), British botanist
Rachel Thompson, fictional character in Cuckoo (TV series)
Rachel Thompson, fictional character in Beautiful Dreamer (2006 film)

See also
 Rachel Thomson, professor at Loughborough University